The Ramona Branch was a railroad branch line in Kent County, Michigan.  First placed in service in August, 1888, it ran  starting from its connection at its western end with the Detroit, Lansing and Northern Railroad (now a CN line) at Oakdale Park Station in southeast Grand Rapids, Michigan. It ran in a northeasterly direction to end at the popular resort Reeds Lake in East Grand Rapids, Michigan.    It is a separate line from the Grand Rapids & Reeds Lake Railway line that connected to Ramona Park in the same area.

Remnants
The line was abandoned.  Remnants remain in a railroad spur along Ramona Street in south east Grand Rapids, Michigan, as well as in several paths and walkways.  The former course of the line can be seen on city maps, as several streets are interrupted by the former course of the railbed.

References

Transportation in Kent County, Michigan
Defunct Michigan railroads
Railway lines opened in 1888